Chankapur Dam, is an earthfill dam on the Girna River near Abhona in Kalwan tehsil of Nashik district in the state of Maharashtra in India. The dam were built in 19th century by British. Chankapur is one of the biggest dam in Maharashtra.

Specifications

Purpose
 Irrigation

See also
 Dams in Maharashtra
 List of reservoirs and dams in India

References

Dams in Nashik district
Dams completed in 1911
1911 establishments in India